EGG, the arts show is an American nonfiction television program that aired on PBS from January 13, 2000 to April 8, 2005. EGG documented both the famous and the unusual aspects and projects of classical and modern arts; its narrator was Elaine Stritch.

Produced by Thirteen/WNET New York, Jeff Folmsbee served as Executive Producer. Mark Mannucci was series producer.  EGG won a Peabody Award in 2002. Trio (owned by NBC/Vivendi Universal Entertainment), the pop culture/popular arts entertainment cable network has aired the series in reruns.

Pat Rabdau worked as a producer and cameraman.

Episodes

Season 1 (2000) 
Who Needs It (January 13, 2000)
Working Dancers (January 20, 2000)
The Body (January 27, 2000)
Space (February 3, 2000)
Homegrown Sounds (February 10, 2000)
Love, Longing, Desire (February 17, 2000)
Money, Greed, Power (February 24, 2000)
Machismo (March 2, 2000)
What Is the Ideal Woman? (March 23, 2000)
Who Am I? (March 30, 2000)
Theater on the Edge (April 6, 2000)
Who's the Art Boss? (April 13, 2000)

Season 2 (2001-2002)

Season 3 (2002-2003)
Giving Up the Ghost (September 20, 2002)
Features three artists who probe life's one inescapable truth: We're all going to die. Sally Mann photographs death and its beauty. Grammy Award-winning music legend Ralph Stanley sings Appalachian songs about longing and loss. And Tim Bovard, the taxidermist-in-residence at the Natural History Museum of Los Angeles County, turns lions, gorillas, and birds that have met their maker into gorgeous works of art.

Eat Me (September 27, 2002)
A smorgasbord of food as subject of art. The short film The History of Food in Art begins with cave paintings and ends in Will Cotton's idea of Candyland. Catherine Chalmers' photographs of caterpillars, frogs, and praying mantises devouring their prey illustrate the principle of "eat or be eaten." Saxton Freymann makes whimsical sculptures out of leeks, green and red peppers, pumpkins, and potatoes. And Wim Delvoye's Cloaca is an art installation that replicates the human digestive system—right down to the very last poop.

Freedom (October 4, 2002)
Three artists face the question, "What is the price of freedom?" Iranian-born Shirin Neshat creates works in film, video, photography, and performance that explore the injustices against women in her homeland. Graphic novelist Joe Sacco ventures to war-torn Bosnia and Palestine to document the struggles of the civilians who live there. And The Onion, a weekly comic newspaper, parodies the real news and exercises the constitutional right to freedom of expression; produced by Josh Block.

Slippery When Wet (October 11, 2002)
This episode is about H2O and art. Mary Zimmerman's Metamorphoses is making a big splash—the whole play takes place in a 27-foot-long pool. Connie Imboden's underwater black-and-white photos are eerie and surreal; taking them has helped her conquer her lifelong fear of water. Ice sculptors compete at the 2002 Winter Olympics Art Trials, and surf photographers turn breaking waves, boards, and beach babes into works of art.

Family (October 18, 2002)
Three segments on families in art: For more than 30 years, filmmaker Ross McElwee has documented the everyday events of his life and family and, in the process, explored questions that are important to everyone. Great American playwright Edward Albee mines the ins and outs of the dysfunctional family in his body of work, which includes Who's Afraid of Virginia Woolf, Three Tall Women, and, most recently, The Goat. And from the Mills Brothers to the Everly Brothers and beyond, "Sibling Harmony" proves that some families not only get along, but sing along, too.

The Mysteries of Life Explained to You (October 25, 2002)
Features artists whose work tackles the "big questions." Richard Foreman has been creating experimental theater since the 1960s, based on the premise that life makes no sense. David Wilson's Museum of Jurassic Technology is a modern-day cabinet of wonders, challenging ideas of what's real, what's not, and what a museum can be. Andy Goldsworthy's art explores the mysteries of nature and the beauty of life's impermanence.

Inspiration (November 1, 2002)
Actor Liev Schreiber, jazz musician Joshua Redman, conceptual artist Vik Muniz, and painter Ann Gale talk about how they create their art. Also featured are comments from author John Updike, painter Chuck Close, and visual artist-architect Vito Acconci.

Gimme Shelter (November 8, 2002)
Profiles two architectural visionaries and looks at the future of the American skyscraper. For 30 years, Paolo Soleri has been working in the Arizona desert to build a new kind of city. Samuel Mockbee and his students build fantastic modern homes from recycled materials—for the nation's poorest.

The Voice (November 15, 2002)
Celebrates the power and range of that most extraordinary musical instrument—the human voice—with opera tenor Juan Diego Florez, rocker Ani DiFranco, monks of the Drepung Gomang Monastery, gospel singer Sam Moore, poet Tracie Morris, and Albanian folk singer Besim Muriqui.

Jerry Stiller & Anne Meara: Jerry Needs a Hobby (January 10, 2003)
In search of a hobby for himself, Jerry looks for inspiration in the following segments: Regent, ND native Gary Greff tries to revive his dying hometown by creating the "Enchanted Highway," a stretch of I-94 peppered with enormous metal sculptures. Men ranging in age from 10 to 80 spend a few weeks at an intensive workshop on the art of barbershop quartet singing at Harmony College. And Sid Laverents, age 93, explains the creative work he's done as a prolific filmmaker.

Jerry Stiller & Anne Meara: Jerry Goes Macho (January 17, 2003)
Jerry ponders his masculinity with segments about playwright David Mamet, who captures the essence of the male psyche in his works; dry cleaner/poet Isidore Elfman, who writes and performs love poems inspired by his wife; laid-off steelworkers in Bethlehem, PA who use theater to help them come to terms with their experiences; and Richard Serra's massive creation Switch, six rolled 50-foot sheets of metal that dramatize the artistic concepts of space, mass, volume, form, and light.

Jerry Stiller & Anne Meara: Jerry Feels Sad (January 24, 2003)
Four documentary segments convince Jerry that art is good for the soul: Jeff Koons' playful sculptures of puppies seem to have anti-depressant properties. South of downtown Los Angeles, workers in an auto repair shop express themselves and perk up the dismal landscape by making "muffler men"—sculptures crafted from spare muffler parts. A trip to Pulaski, WI yields valuable lessons about what it really means to polka. And bonsai master Harry Hirao scours the California desert for material for his projects, which aim for the perfect blend of harmony, shape, and balance.

Jack LaLanne's Dance Spectacular (January 31, 2003)
Legendary physical trainer Jack LaLanne introduces segments on dance: Oregon Ballet Theatre star Tracy Taylor defines ballet and shares the joys and pains of the art. Choreographer David Parsons captures human "flight" by shining a strobe light on dancers just as they leap into the air. Inspired by Fred Astaire and Gene Kelly, salsa dancer Johnny Vazquez teaches would-be dancers in Southern California and competes around the world. And Dudley Williams, 63, a veteran Alvin Ailey dancer, explains why age adds depth to dance performances.

EGG's Big Experiment (February 7, 2003)
A rapid-fire introduction to the work of a wide variety of artists: painter Ida Applebroog, sculptor Ron Mueck, performance poet Tracie Morris, installation artists Vanessa Beecroft and Zoe Leonard, third-generation puppeteer Basil Twist, collage artist Bradley Rubinstein, musician Aimee Mann (former lead singer of 'Til Tuesday), hearing-impaired swing dancer Joseph Templin, painter Eric Fischl, photographer Adrienne Salinger, Puerto Rican troubadour Hiram Martinez, the Dance Brazil troupe, metal sculptor Rob De Mar, elderly ballroom dancer Bel Kauffman, and Elizabeth Streb's acrobatic dancers.

Best of Egg: Love, Fear, Hope and Dreams (February 14, 2003)
Photographer Connie Imboden, cartoonist Joe Sacco, and a group of young singers confront their fears, hopes, loves, and dreams in order to intensify their work.

EGG's Lucky Loyal Viewer Sweepstakes (February 21, 2003)
The luckiest loyal viewer presents his or her favorite episode. Also, Sally Mann's photographs of her deceased family dog, opera tenor Juan Diego Florez, and Andy Goldworthy's art about nature's mysteries.

The Spencer Kayden Show (February 28, 2003)
The talented star of Urinetown hosts half an hour of coolness and weirdness.

When Good Puppets Go Bad (April 4, 2003)
Characters from the puppet comedy group the Elementals look back at the history of TV puppets; Tom Friedman creates masterpieces from toilet paper, laundry detergent, bubble gum, and toothpicks; taxidermist Tim Bovard creates elaborate dioramas with actual lions, gorillas, exotic birds, and countless other stuffable animals for the Natural History Museum of Los Angeles County; and "confessional" artist Tracey Emin uses her own experiences as the themes in her installations, photographs, films, poems, blankets, and drawings.

When Pad Puppets Apologize (April 11, 2003)
The Elementals puppets return to make up for their inappropriately raunchy appearance on the previous program by introducing more wholesome segments. Topics include yodeling cowboy Wylie Gustafson and the National Old-Time Country Festival in Avoca, IA; citizens of Apple Valley, MN auditioning for roles in a production of Hair; and Minnesota's annual State Fair Crop Art Competition, where entries include a portrait of Jesse Ventura rendered in flax with a sprinkling of oats and Edvard Munch's The Scream done in canola, corn, and sorghum.

Broadway Workshop (April 18, 2003)
Behind the scenes at the series' own original television musical.

Season 4 (2004)
The Jesus, Buddha & Mohammed Show (February 13, 2004)

Season 5 (2005)
Body Parts (December 21, 2005)

References

External links
 
 Past episodes on Little Big Pictures

2000 American television series debuts
2003 American television series endings
PBS original programming
Television series by WNET